Joseph Christian Ernest Bourret (9 December 1827 in the hamlet of Labro, near Saint-Étienne-de-Lugdarès, Ardèche – 10 July 1896 in Rodez) was a French churchman, bishop and cardinal.

Life
Joseph-Christian-Ernest Bourret was ordained into the Oratory of Saint Philip Neri as priest in 1851 in Paris.  He was ordained bishop of Rodez in 1871, and made a cardinal by Pope Leo XIII in 1893.

Sources
This page is a translation of :fr:Joseph-Christian-Ernest Bourret.
Catholic Hierarchy.org

1827 births
1896 deaths
People from Ardèche
Bishops of Rodez
19th-century French cardinals
Cardinals created by Pope Leo XIII